Romance of the Three Kingdoms 12, also known as , is the 12th installment in the Romance of the Three Kingdoms (Sangokushi) strategy game series by Koei. The game was released for the PC in 2012 in Japan and Taiwan and on December 13, 2012 for the Wii U and PlayStation 3 in Japan. The game is released in Japanese and Traditional Chinese. Additional scenarios can be unlocked throughout the game.

Reception
Sangokushi 12 has had a mixed to poor review ever since it was launched in 2012. Complaints include the lack of naval warfare, lack of unit types, and the overall gameplay. Though overall cities have been replaced by detailed maps with buildings you can place, the elaborate 3D duels throughout Sangokushi 11 have been downgraded to a video.

References

External links 
 Japan Gamecity RTK12 page
 Taiwan Gamecity RTK12 page

2012 video games
12
Turn-based strategy video games
Nintendo Network games
PlayStation 3 games
Video games developed in Japan
Wii U games
Wii U eShop games
Windows games
Japan-exclusive video games
Grand strategy video games